Meeten's Mill is a grade II listed smock mill at West Chiltington, Sussex, England, which has been converted to residential use.

History

Meeten's Mill was originally built at Monkmead, and moved to West Chiltington in 1838. The mill first appeared on the West Chiltington tithe map of 1840. The mill was refitted by William Cooper, the Henfield millwright in 1865. It was working until 1922, when it was stripped of machinery and house converted. The millstones went to a watermill at Coolham.

Description

Rock Mill is a two-storey smock mill on a two-storey stone base, with a stage at first-floor level. She had four Spring sails. The cap is in the Kentish style, winded by a fantail. The mill drove three pairs of millstones. The mill only has two sails and the fantail is missing. Various extensions have been made to the smock tower.

Millers

Hammond 1840 - 1844
Willmer 1845 - 
Meeten 1898 - 1918

References for above:

References

External links
Windmill World Page on West Chiltington windmill.

Further reading
 Online version

Smock mills in England
Grinding mills in the United Kingdom
Windmills completed in 1838
Grade II listed buildings in West Sussex
Windmills in West Sussex
Octagonal buildings in the United Kingdom